NSTC may refer to:

 National Science and Technology Council (Taiwan), a government council of Taiwan
 National Science Talent Contest
 National Sports Training Center, a sport center in Kaohsiung, Taiwan
 National Science and Technology Council, in the US
 Nova Scotia Teachers College
 Nova Scotia Technical College, now the Technical University of Nova Scotia
 Novi Sad Theological College
 Naval Service Training Command
 North Slope Training Cooperative